Spazio Ilisso - Art Archives Museum is a Sardinian cultural promotion and enhancement center that integrates a museum with a permanent exhibition on 20th century and contemporary Sardinian sculpture, temporary exhibitions, digital archives and events.

It's located in the historic center of Nuoro.

History 
Spazio Ilisso opened to the public on the 14 of December 2019. Is located in the architectonic complex of the old Papandrea House, an Art Deco-style villa, adapted for the new function after a long and detailed philological restoration. This architectural complex contains an internal part for exhibitions and an external one, thanks to the presence of a courtyard already used for the placing of sculptures by Sardinian artists.

Since December 2019 it has hosted a photo exhibition by Marianne Sin-Pfältzer, German photographer and designer of which the Ilisso publishing house, that manages the museum structure, manages the photographic archive,. and who has worked a lot in Sardinia, also spending the last years of her life in Nuoro. On one of its floors and in the internal courtyard it hosts, from 7 July 2021, a permanent exhibition on the most important Sardinian sculptors of the twentieth century.

Exposition

Permanent - Museum of 20th-century sculpture 
The permanent collection, inaugurated on 7 July 2021, is dedicated to 20th century Sardinian sculpture, and includes works by Francesco Ciusa, Maria Lai, Salvatore Fancello, Costantino Nivola, Eugenio Tavolara, Pinuccio Sciola and Gavino Tilocca.

Temporary exhibitions 
The temporary exhibitions are curated by the same Ilisso publishing house .

 “Marianne Sin-Pfältzer - Paesaggi umani” (2019-2020)   Monographic exhibition dedicated to the Ger,man photographer Marianne Sin-Pfältzer.
 ”Osserva le distanze - Esercita il pensiero”  (2020)  Exhibition in collaboration with the AIAP.

Digital Archives of Applied Arts and Historical Photography 
Spazio Ilisso hosts the digital archives of Applied Art and Historical Photography, which collect photographs, films and documentaries on Sardinia with contributions from many photographers such as Marianne Sin-Pfältzer, Max Leopold Wagner, Raffaele Ciceri, Antonio Ballero.

See also 

 Nuoro

References

External links 

 
 

Museums in Sardinia
Nuoro